Keith Nelson may refer to:

Keith Nelson (basketball) (born 1969), American former basketball player
Keith Nelson (footballer) (1947–2020), New Zealand international footballer
Keith Nelson (musician), producer and guitarist of Buckcherry
Keith Nelson (rugby union) (born 1938), New Zealand rugby union player
Keith A. Nelson, American chemist
Keith Nelson, a fictional character played by Eric Stoltz in the film Some Kind of Wonderful